Lantos is a Hungarian surname. Notable people with the surname include: 

Csaba Lantos (born 1943), Hungarian volleyball player
Csaba Lantos (born 1962), Hungarian economist
Gabriella Lantos (born 1970), Hungarian fencer
John D. Lantos (born 1954), American paediatrician
László Lantos (born 1938), Hungarian swimmer
Mária Balla-Lantos (born 1944), Hungarian swimmer
Mihály Lantos (1928–1989), Hungarian footballer and manager
Peter Lantos (born 1939), British scientist
Robert Lantos (born 1949), Canadian film producer
Tom Lantos (1928–2008), American politician

Hungarian-language surnames